Sir Helenus Patrick Joseph Milmo, DL (born Helenus Padraic Seosamh Milmo; 24 August 1908 – 30 August 1988) was an Irish lawyer in Britain and High Court judge.

Early life and education
He was born in County Limerick, Ireland on 24 August 1908, the third son of Daniel and Kathleen (née White) Milmo, but spent his early years in Furbogh, Galway Gaeltacht. Milmo attended St. Gerard's School, Downside School and Trinity College, Cambridge; he was called to the Bar and was later appointed QC in 1961.

Career
During World War II, Milmo was a member of MI5. Having previously worked under Kim Philby, Milmo was selected to investigate Philby in 1951, when Philby's espionage became increasingly obvious. Milmo failed to elicit definitive answers and concluded "that Philby is and has been for many years a Soviet agent. But the case remained unproven." Milmo's peers were not entirely forgiving. "Some felt", wrote Peter Carter-Ruck when Milmo died in 1988, "that he was perhaps too much of a gentleman for that daunting task."

Milmo was appointed to the High Court in 1964.

Personal life
Milmo married Joan Frances Morley (9 March 1907 – June 1978), the second daughter of Francis Morley of Sloan Court, London, in 1933. The couple had five children:

 Deirdre (born 1934) 
 Patrick, QC (born 1938), a barrister 
 Verity (born 1941) 
 Shaun (born 1943), a journalist
 Patricia (born 1949/1950), a solicitor; she married Bennett Umunna in 1976

His grandson Chuka Umunna has been a British Member of Parliament. His other grandchildren include journalists Cahal and Daniel Milmo, and Marc, investment banker and Director at finnCap.

Joan Milmo died in 1978, aged 71, from undisclosed causes. Helenus Milmo's second marriage, in 1980, was to Mrs Anne Brand the widow of Francis Bernard Brand. Mrs Brand was born Anne Gilmore O'Connell, the daughter of Maurice William O'Connell. Anne, Lady Milmo (born 27 May 1907 – died 28 November 2003) died at age 96.

Sir Helenus Milmo died in 1988 in Chichester, West Sussex, six days after his 80th birthday.

References

External links
 Image at National Portrait Gallery (NPG), npg.org.uk; accessed 30 November 2014.

1908 births
1988 deaths
Lawyers from County Limerick
People from County Galway
Queen's Bench Division judges
MI5 personnel
Knights Bachelor
20th-century King's Counsel
British Roman Catholics
People educated at Downside School
People from Chichester
Alumni of Trinity College, Cambridge
Date of death missing
People educated at St Gerard's School, Bray